The 1990 California gubernatorial election was held on November 6, 1990. The Republican candidate, Senator Pete Wilson, defeated the Democratic candidate, the former San Francisco Mayor Dianne Feinstein, who would later go on to win Wilson's Senate seat.

Feinstein won the Democratic nomination against opponents including California Attorney General John Van de Kamp, while Wilson faced minimal opposition in his bid for the Republican nomination.

Primary elections
 Republican: Pete Wilson, U.S. Senator from California
 Democratic: Dianne Feinstein, Mayor of San Francisco defeated State Attorney General, John Van de Kamp.

General election results
Final results from the Secretary of State of California:

Results by county:

By congressional district

References

External links
Election Results

Gubernatorial
1990
California